2006–07 Syed Mushtaq Ali Trophy was the first edition of the Syed Mushtaq Ali Trophy competition, an Indian domestic team only Twenty20 cricket tournament in India. It was called as Inter State Twenty-20 Tournament. It was contested by 27 teams. Tamil Nadu emerged as winners of the tournament.

Group stage

Central Zone

North Zone

South Zone

East Zone

West Zone

Super League Stage

Group A

Group B

Final

External links
 Series home at ESPN Cricinfo

Syed Mushtaq Ali Trophy
Syed Mushtaq Ali Trophy